Dark sector can mean:

 Dark Sector, a third-person shooter video game
 the hidden sector, also known as the dark sector, a hypothetical realm of forces in physics